Plica is a genus of tropidurid lizards found in South America and the Caribbean. Species in the genus Plica are arboreal, medium-sized lizards.

Taxonomy
For a long time, the genus Plica was considered to include four species: two relatively widespread ones (P. plica and P. umbra) and two tepuis-associated species with narrow distributions (P. lumaria and P. pansticta). However, recent research has shown that P. plica is a cryptic species complex, and four new species were described in 2013. The species count will likely increase as there are still several undescribed species.

Species
The currently recognized species are the following:
 Plica lumaria 
 Plica pansticta 
 Plica plica  – collared tree runner, tree runner
 Plica umbra  – blue-lipped tree lizard, harlequin racerunner
Formerly included in Plica plica:
 Plica caribeana  – Caribbean treerunner
 Plica kathleenae  – Kathleen’s treerunner
 Plica medemi  – Medem’s treerunner
 Plica rayi  – Ray’s treerunner

Nota bene: A binomial authority in parentheses indicates that the species was originally described in a genus other than Plica.

References

Plica
Lizards of South America
Reptiles of the Caribbean
Lizard genera
Taxa named by John Edward Gray